The 2014–15 Biathlon World Cup is a multi-race tournament over a season of biathlon, organised by the International Biathlon Union. The season started on 30 November 2014 in Östersund, Sweden, and ended on 22 March 2015 in Khanty-Mansiysk, Russia.

A new event, called the "Single mixed relay", made its World Cup debut on 6 February 2015 in Nové Město. This event involves one male and one female biathlete each completing two legs consisting of one prone and one standing shoot.

Calendar
Below is the IBU World Cup calendar for the 2014–15 season.

Men

World Cup Podiums

Men's Relay Podiums

Standings

Overall

Individual

Sprint

Pursuit

Mass start

Relay

Nation

Women

World Cup Podiums

Women's Relay Podiums

Standings

Overall

Individual

Sprint

Pursuit

Mass start

Relay

Nation

Mixed Relay

Standings

Mixed relay 

Final standings after 4 races.

Medal table

Achievements
First World Cup career victory
, 24, in her 4th season — the WC 1 Sprint in Östersund; first podium was 2013–14 Pursuit in Annecy-Le Grand Bornand
, 26, in her 9th season — the WC 4 Sprint in Oberhof; first podium was 2012–13 Pursuit in Oberhof
, 26, in her 6th season — the WC 5 Sprint in Ruhpolding; it also was her first podium
, 21, in her 3rd season — the WC 7 Sprint in Nové Město; first podium was 2014–15 Sprint in Antholz-Anterselva
, 28, in her 8th season — the World Championships Sprint in Kontiolahti; first podium was 2008–09 Pursuit in Khanty-Mansiysk
, 26, in his 6th season — the World Championships Pursuit in Kontiolahti; first podium was 2012–13 Individual in Östersund
, 30, in her 7th season — the World Championships Individual in Kontiolahti; it also was her first podium
, 29, in his 7th season — the WC 9 Pursuit in Khanty-Mansiysk; first podium was 2015 World Championships Sprint in Kontiolahti

First World Cup podium
, 29, in her 6th season — no. 2 in the WC 2 Sprint in Hochfilzen
 , 22, in her 3rd season — no. 3 in the WC 2 Pursuit in Hochfilzen
, 23, in her 4th season — no. 3 in the WC 4 Sprint in Oberhof
, 20, in her 2nd season — no. 2 in the WC 5 Mass Start in Ruhpolding
, 22, in his 2nd season — no. 2 in the WC 5 Mass Start in Ruhpolding
, 21, in her 3rd season — no. 3 in the WC 6 Sprint in Antholz-Anterselva
, 27, in her 4th season — no. 2 in the WC 7 Sprint in Nové Město
, 28, in her 8th season — no.2 in the World Championships Sprint in Kontiolahti
, 29, in his 7th season — no.2 in the World Championships Sprint in Kontiolahti
, 24, in his 4th season — no. 3 in the WC 9 Sprint in Khanty-Mansiysk

Victory in this World Cup (all-time number of victories in parentheses)

Men
 , 8 (37) first places
 , 4 (8) first places
 , 3 (8) first places
 , 3 (5) first places
 , 2 (37) first places
 , 2 (7) first places
 , 1 (7) first place
 , 1 (1) first place
 , 1 (1) first place

Women
 , 9 (25) first places
 , 6 (15) first places
 , 2 (2) first places
 , 2 (2) first places
 , 1 (8) first place
 , 1 (2) first place
 , 1 (1) first place
 , 1 (1) first place
 , 1 (1) first place
 , 1 (1) first place

Retirements
Following notable biathletes announced their retirement during or after the 2014–15 season:

Men
 
 
 
 
 
 
 

Women
 
 
 
 
 
 
 
 
 
 
 
 
 
  (comeback in 2015–16 season)

External links
IBU official site

References

 
Biathlon World Cup
2014 in biathlon
2015 in biathlon